Had to Cry Today may refer to:

 Had to Cry Today (song), a song by Blind Faith
 Had to Cry Today (album), an album by Joe Bonamassa